Yazid Mansouri (Yazīd Manṣūrī) (born 25 February 1978) is a former footballer who played as a midfielder. Born in France, he represented Algeria at international level, gaining 67 caps over ten years.

Club career
Born in Revin, Ardennes, France, Mansouri began his career at Tinqueux SC, a small team from Tinqueux who were playing in the sixth division. At age 17, he left the club and signed with Le Havre AC who were playing in Ligue 1, where he spent his first two seasons playing in the reserve side. He made his debut in the first game of the 1997–98 season, coming as a second-half substitute against Olympique de Marseille. He would slowly assert himself at the club and would eventually go on to make 134 appearances and scoring 2 goals in 6 seasons in both Ligue 1 and Ligue 2.

At the start of the 2003–04 season, Mansouri was loaned out for the season to English Championship side Coventry City F.C. Mansouri made 14 appearances in the first half of the season before leaving, against the clubs wishes, to play for Algeria at the 2004 African Cup of Nations in Mali. His contract was subsequently terminated and he remained without a club for the rest of the season.

In the summer of 2004, Mansouri signed with Ligue 2 side LB Châteauroux where he easily imposed himself in the middle of the park. He would go on to make 63 appearances for the club, starting every one of them, and scoring 2 goals. He was also the captain of the team in the 2005–2006 season.

At the beginning of the 2006 season, Mansouri signed a two-year contract with Ligue 1 side FC Lorient.

On 23 June 2010, Mansouri signed a Two-year contract with Qatari-side Al-Sailiya.

On 22 December 2011, Mansouri signed a contract until the end of the season with Algerian side CS Constantine.

International career
Mansouri first featured for the Algerian national team in a set of friendlies against FC Zürich and ES Troyes in 1999. He received his first official call-up to the national team on 6 November 2001 in a friendly game against France in Paris. He was a member of the squad at the 2002 African Cup of Nations, 2004 African Cup of Nations and 2010 African Cup of Nations, where Algeria finished fourth.

Mansouri was a member of the Algerian squad at the 2010 World Cup; however, he lost the captaincy and a spot in the starting line-up prior to the first fixture against Slovenia and did not participate in any of the three games. Shortly after the 2010 World Cup, Mansouri announced his international retirement from international football on 26 June 2010, after mentioning to the media that he would not be participating in the friendly in August against Gabon and the 2012 African Cup of Nations qualifiers. With 67 appearances for the national team, he is the 9th most capped player in Algeria's history.

Career statistics

International

References

1978 births
Living people
Sportspeople from Ardennes (department)
Association football midfielders
French footballers
Algerian footballers
Algeria international footballers
2002 African Cup of Nations players
2004 African Cup of Nations players
2010 Africa Cup of Nations players
Le Havre AC players
Coventry City F.C. players
LB Châteauroux players
FC Lorient players
Al-Sailiya SC players
French people of Kabyle descent
French sportspeople of Algerian descent
Kabyle people
Ligue 1 players
Ligue 2 players
Algerian expatriate footballers
French expatriate footballers
Expatriate footballers in England
Expatriate footballers in Qatar
Algerian expatriate sportspeople in England
2010 FIFA World Cup players
Algerian expatriate sportspeople in Qatar
French expatriate sportspeople in England
French expatriate sportspeople in Qatar
Qatar Stars League players
CS Constantine players
Algerian Ligue Professionnelle 1 players
Footballers from Grand Est